Bucy may refer to:

People
 John Bucy III, American businessman and politician
 Michel Bucy (1484–1511), archbishop of Bourges and illegitimate son of Louis XII
 Paul Bucy (1904–1992), American neurosurgeon
 Richard S. Bucy, American mathematician known for the Kalman filter

Places
 Bucy-le-Long, France
 Bucy-le-Roi, France
 Bucy-lès-Cerny, France
 Bucy-lès-Pierrepont, France
 Bucy-Saint-Liphard, France